General Count Thord C:son (Carlsson) Bonde af Björnö (17March 1900 – 18October 1969) was a Swedish Army officer. His senior commands include military commander of the VII Military District in 1955, commander of the III Military District from 1955 to 1957 and Chief of the Army from 1957 to 1963.

Early life
Bonde was born on 17 March 1900 in Stockholm, Sweden, the son of Crown Equerry, Count Carl Bonde and his first wife Blanche (née Dickson). He was brother of Carl C:son Bonde and half-brother of financier and cabinet chamberlain Peder Bonde.

Career
Bonde became second lieutenant in the Life Regiment Hussars (K 3) in 1920 and captain of the General Staff in 1932. He was promoted to major in 1941, lieutenant colonel in 1943 and served as military attaché in Washington, D.C. from 1943 to 1945. He was promoted to colonel in 1946 and was appointed head of Section 1 and Vice Chief of the Defence Staff the same year. Bonde was Chief of Staff of United Nations Truce Supervision Organization (UNTSO) from May 1948 to July 1948 when Åge Lundström succeeded him. On 6 July 1948, Bonde was subjected to Arab firing as he intervened in a battle that occurred near the Arab village of Jaba' south of Haifa en route to Tel Aviv. Bonde  was rescued from the situation by a UN jeep. Bonde returned to Sweden from Damascus on 13 July.

Back in Sweden, Bonde continued serving as head of Section 1 in the Defence Staff until February 1950 when he was appointed second-in-command of the Svea Life Guards (I 1). He took command of the regiment on 1 October 1950. He then served as head of the Swedish National Defence College from 1953 to 1955. Bonde was promoted to major general in 1954. Bonde was the military commander of the VII Military District in 1955 and the III Military District from 1955 to 1957 when he was promoted to lieutenant general. He was Chief of the Army from 1957 to 1963 and was appointed general upon his retirement in 1963.

Bonde was chief of His Majesty's Military Staff from 1963 to 1969 and chairman of the Directorate of the Swedish Nobility Foundation (Riddarhusdirektionen) from 1965.

Personal life
In 1926, Bonde married Anna-Greta Sjöberg (1900–1983), the daughter of the state agricultural engineer A. L. G. Sjöberg and his wife. He was the father of Birgitta (born 1927), Margaretha (born 1931) and Claes (born 1941).

Dates of rank
1920 – Second lieutenant
19?? – Lieutenant
1932 – Captain
1941 – Major
1943 – Lieutenant colonel
1946 – Colonel
1954 – Major general
1957 – Lieutenant general
1963 – General

Awards and decorations

Swedish
   Commander Grand Cross of the Order of the Sword (6 June 1959)
  Commander of the Order of Vasa
  Knight of the Order of the Polar Star

Foreign
  Commander Grand Cross of the Order of the Lion of Finland
  Grand Cross of the Order of St. Olav (1 July 1960)
  1st Class / Knight Grand Cross of the Order of Merit of the Italian Republic (15 July 1968)
  Commander of the Legion of Merit (4 December 1959)
  Officer of the Legion of Merit (1946)

Honours
Member of Royal Swedish Academy of War Sciences (1945)

References

1900 births
1969 deaths
Swedish Army generals
United Nations military personnel
Chiefs of Army (Sweden)
Military personnel from Stockholm
Members of the Royal Swedish Academy of War Sciences
Commanders Grand Cross of the Order of the Sword
Commanders of the Order of Vasa
Knights of the Order of the Polar Star
Commanders Grand Cross of the Order of the Lion of Finland
Commanders of the Legion of Merit
20th-century Swedish military personnel
Swedish military attachés